The Bonaparte Indian Band a.k.a. Bonaparte First Nation, is a member band of the Shuswap Nation Tribal Council of the Secwepemc (Shuswap) people.

Indian Reserves and communities

The band's main community is on the Bonaparte Indian Reserve No. 3, located  comprising 704 ha., usually known as the Bonaparte Reserve, between Cache Creek and the terminus of Highway 99 at the Hat Creek Ranch or Lower Hat Creek (a.k.a. Carquile), Some band members work as guides, interpreters and wranglers for the Hat Creek Ranch, which is a heritage museum/restoration of a roadhouse of the Cariboo Wagon Road and had been the homestead of Donald McLean, former Chief Trader at Fort Kamloops and one of the combatants and casualties of the Chilcotin War of 1864.

Other reserves are: 
 Lower Hat Creek 2, 31.6 ha., on Hat Creek between Marble Canyon and that creek's confluence with the Bonaparte River (not to be confused with Lower Hat Creek, or Carquile, which is at the confluence of the creek and the river). 
 Grasslands 7, 207.6 ha., at McLean Lake, in the Trachyte Hills northwest of Cache Creek 
 Hihium Lake 6 (Shared between Upper Nicola, Lower Nicola, Bonaparte, and Tk’emlúps te Secwépemc Bands), 31.6 ha.  
 Hihium Lake 6A (Shared between the Skeetchestn and Bonaparte Bands), on north shore of Hihium Lake near NE corner of Hihium Lake Indian Reserve No. 6, 2.10 ha.
 Hihium Lake 6B (Shared between the Skeetchestn and Bonaparte Bands), on south shore of Hihium Lake, near its east end, 2.0 ha.  
 Loon Lake 4, 24.6 ha., at Loon Lake 
 Mauvais Rocher 5, 40.2 ha., on the Thompson River to the east of Ashcroft 
 Upper Hat Creek 1, 835.3 ha., on Hat Creek to the southeast of Marble Canyon and north of the locality of Upper Hat Creek. 

The reserves were created when the government of the Colony of British Columbia, without negotiation or consent of the First nations, and without legally extinguishing First Nations claim to the land, established an Indian reserve system in the 1860s.

Population

The Bonaparte Indian Band are also called the Stuctwesemc in Secwepemctsín, which means "people of the Valley" (also spelled St'uxwtews).  Band population is 815, with 584 living off-reserve.

References

External links
Shuswap Nation website 
Map of Bonaparte Nation territory 
Chief and Council listing, band website 

Secwepemc governments
Bonaparte Country